Fiagdon (Fyjjagdon) is a river in North Ossetia–Alania (Russia) west of Vladikavkaz. It flows north between the Ardon and the Gizeldon and joins the Ardon before that river joins the Terek. Verkhny Fiagdon and Dzuarikau are some of the major villages that lie on Fiagdon River.

Etymology
Fiagdon is a river in Russia, located in the Republic of North Ossetia-Alania. The name of the river is derived from the Ossetian words "fiyag" and "don", which mean "wooden shovel" and "water/river" respectively. According to local legends, the Kurtatinsky gorge, where the river flows, was once entirely covered with thick forest and the river was covered with moss. The first settlers of the gorge used wooden shovels to clear the riverbed and take water from it. This is believed to be the origin of the name "Fiagdon".

References

Rivers of North Ossetia–Alania